Devourism was the pejorative term to describe the political regime which established itself in Portugal following the Liberal Wars, particularly during the period from 24 September 1834 to 9 September 1836, while the Constitutional Charter of 1826 was in effect. It was intended to convey a sense of unprincipled greed, whereby leading politicians spent public funds in abundance to secure personal gain for themselves or their associates. The term was coined after a piece of legislation was drafted on 15 April 1835, which provided for the sale of national property and property of the Catholic Church, and facilitated their disposal among leading members of the liberal party.

One of the great reforms of this period was the reform of local administration, which divided the country into seventeen districts on 25 April 1835), also creating three new districts Madeira and the Azores. The position of Civil Governor was established, with postholders choosing mayors, who in turn chose parish commissioners. These reforms, with their substantially centralising effect, were used to steadily remove radicals from positions of power and replace them with those who had favoured the cause of Miguel I and the return of an absolute monarchy.

Devourist Governments

First government: Duque de Palmela
The first Devourist government took office on the day King Pedro IV died, on 24 September 1834. Led by the Duque de Palmela, it was composed of conservatives and the late king's associates in the Grand Orient of Portugal Masonic lodge. After 28 April 1835, Palmela was succeeded by the Count of Linhares. The members of the government were:

Second government: Duque de Saldanha
The second Devourist government took office on 27 May 1835 and served until 18 November.

Saldanha's government fell for two main reasons. The first had to do with a heavily-contested decree of 3 November which auctioned off publicly owned estuarine lands of the Tejo and Sado River. The other was the sending of the Auxiliary Division to Spain at the request of its government to support Isabel II against her uncle Carlos, who was claiming the throne. The members of this government were:

Third Government: José Jorge Loureiro
The third Devourist government took office on 18 November 1835 with Saldanha once again as its leader, until 25 November. It lasted until 20 April 1836. Its stated purpose was to defend ‘morality, the economy and freedom from special interests.’ To demonstrate their commitment, ministers reduced their own salaries by one half, in contrast to the approach of the previous Fonseca administration. The Loureiro government fell following the failure of Finance Minister Francisco António de Campos to secure a majority for his budget. The government was composed of:

Fourth Government: Duque da Terceira
The fourth and final government was led by the Duque da Terceira, and lasted from 20 April to 9 September 1836. It was essentially aristocratic in composition, characterised as chamorro and full of palmelistas, and dominated once again by the Grand Orient Lodge.

Among the measures it took was the closing down of the radical leftist . To improve security it created a Municipal Guard for Porto and strengthened the Municipal Guard in Lisbon. When arson destroyed the Royal Exchequer, it was assumed that the government itself was responsible, seeking to conceal its misspending.

The Devourist period came to an end in September 1836 with the September Revolution. The opposition representatives from the north of the country arrived in Lisbon on 9 September, prompting a popular revolt which the National Guard joined. On 11 September the Duque da Terceira resigned, and the Queen took an oath to the Constitution of 1822. This was the start of “Setembrismo.” The ministers of the Terceira government were:

References

Political history of Portugal
1834 in Portugal
1836 in Portugal
Liberalism in Portugal